Rhisnes, Namur may refer to several places:

Belgian 
 Rhisnes (suburb), a suburb of the city of Namur, Namur province capital
 Rhisnes (village), a village in La Bruyère, Namur province municipality